Harar Brewery is a brewery with its headquarters in Harar, Ethiopia.

Products
Harar Brewery produces Harar Beer, a 5 % abv pale lager, as well as Hakim Stout, a 5.8% abv stout. The brewery also makes Harar Sofi, a non-alcoholic beverage that it markets toward the Muslim population.

Harar Brewery uses water from the Genela spring, which is situated on its premises. It supplements this with water that it pumps from Finkile, located 33 km from the site. 

The brewery is capable of producing 500,000 hectolitres per year.

In 2011, the state-owned Harar Brewery became a subsidiary of Heineken International through a buyout costing $78 million USD.

See also
Harrar Beer Bottling F.C.

References

External links
Official website
RateBeer

Beer in Ethiopia
Breweries of Africa
Food and drink companies of Ethiopia
Harari Region